This is a list of mayors of Denver, the capital and largest city of the state of Colorado. Mayors of Denver can serve three four-year terms.

List

References

Denver
 
Government of Denver